Teratodontidae ("monstrous teeth") is a family of extinct predatory mammals from extinct paraphyletic superfamily Hyainailouroidea within extinct order Hyaenodonta. Fossil remains of these mammals are known from Middle Eocene to Late Miocene deposits in Africa, the Arabian Peninsula, and Asia.

Etymology 
The name of the family and subfamily translates as "monstrous teeth" (and taxonomic suffixes "-idae" and "-inae".

Classification and phylogeny

Taxonomy
 Family: †Teratodontidae 
 Subfamily: †Teratodontinae 
 Genus: †Anasinopa 
 †Anasinopa haasi 
 †Anasinopa leakeyi 
 †Anasinopa libyca 
 †Anasinopa napaki 
 Genus: †Brychotherium 
 †Brychotherium atrox  
 †Brychotherium ephalmos 
 Genus: †Ekweeconfractus 
 †Ekweeconfractus amorui 
 Genus: †Masrasector 
 †Masrasector aegypticum 
 †Masrasector ligabuei 
 †Masrasector nananubis 
 †Masrasector pithecodacos 
 Genus: †Metasinopa 
 †Metasinopa ethiopica 
 †Metasinopa fraasii 
 †Metasinopa osborni 
 †Metasinopa sp. [DPC 4544 & DPC 10199] 
 Tribe: †Dissopsalini 
 Genus: †Buhakia 
 †Buhakia hyaenoides 
 †Buhakia moghraensis 
 †Buhakia sp. I [Karungu, Kenya] 
 †Buhakia sp. II [GSN GT VI 22’17] 
 Genus: †Dissopsalis 
 †Dissopsalis carnifex 
 †Dissopsalis pyroclasticus 
 Tribe: †Teratodontini 
 Genus: †Teratodon 
 †Teratodon enigmae 
 †Teratodon spekei 
 †Teratodon sp. [DPC 8999] 
 Incertae sedis:
 †Teratodontinae sp. (BC 2’08) 
 †Teratodontinae sp. (CBI-1-614)

Phylogeny 
The phylogenetic relationships of family Teratodontidae are shown in the following cladogram:

See also
 Mammal classification
 Hyainailouroidea

References

Hyaenodonts
Cenozoic mammals of Africa
Cenozoic mammals of Asia